Andrew Abraham (born 17 July 1964) is a British singer. He was the runner-up in the second UK series of TV talent show The X Factor in 2005 to Shayne Ward, and also represented the United Kingdom in the Eurovision Song Contest 2008.

Before applying for The X Factor, Abraham was a refuse collector. Prior to this, he worked as a bus driver for Arriva London North based at Palmers Green bus garage. Abraham has two children by his wife Denise, a daughter called Tara and a son called Jacob. He is of Grenadian descent.

Career

2005: The X Factor 
Abraham was narrowly beaten to the top spot on The X Factor by Shayne Ward by 1.2% of the national public vote. Abraham was mentored throughout the competition by Sharon Osbourne although fellow judges Simon Cowell and Louis Walsh also praised the singer highly throughout the competition. Other performers who came to prominence in the same series of The X Factor were finalists Journey South and quarter-finalist Chico Slimani.

After The X Factor 
On 26 March 2006, Abraham's debut album entered the UK Album Chart at number two, selling 176,000 copies in its first week and being beaten to the top spot by Journey South.

In 2006, Abraham's debut album was the twelfth highest selling album of the year with total sales of around 300,000.

Abraham's second album, Soul Man, was not as popular yet it still managed to make the Top 20 in the UK Charts. The album included the Christmas song "December Brings Me Back To You", a duet with television presenter Michael Underwood.

A Very Best Of album was released in May 2008.

His third studio album, Even If, was released in June 2008 to positive reviews, and its title track reached number 67 in the UK Charts.  Album sales were not helped by its distribution company Pinnacle Entertainment (UK) going into administration due to the downturn in the economy. The album was released digitally on iTunes in March 2009.

Abraham released the Christmas single "Oh Holy Night" in December 2009.

On 3 August 2008, it was reported in The Daily Star Sunday newspaper that Abraham had told friends that he would not release any further material, and instead he would concentrate on becoming a property developer. However, on 6 August 2008, Abraham announced on his website that this was not true.

In January 2010 Andy signed up with celebrity management agency Champions (UK) Plc who are working on new material with Andy as well as a number of exciting projects. On 14 March 2010 Andy performed at Arsenal footballer Theo Walcott's 21st birthday party, alongside Beverley Knight.

In 2012 Andy released his fourth album "Remember When", a collection of the songs that influenced him over the years and two new songs. It was released as a book package, with Andy's comments on why he chose each song for the album, some copies also came with an accompanying making of DVD.

Eurovision 2008 

On 1 March 2008, Abraham won Eurovision – Your Decision 2008, the UK selection for the Eurovision Song Contest 2008, held on 24 May 2008, with his song "Even If".  He was selected as a wild card in Eurovision – Your Decision by Terry Wogan and won the contest in a sing-off with favourite Michelle Gayle through a public vote. As one of the 'Big 4' countries, UK automatically qualified for the final on 24 May 2008. In the final, Andy performed second following Romania and preceding Albania. Although Andy did hope the song would make a good showing in Belgrade, his task was not made easy. He came last with only 14 points. Following Eurovision tie-breaking rules, the United Kingdom was placed last overall as it had fewer 12-point votes than Germany and fewer 10-point votes than Poland.

Touring 
Andy Abraham did a variety of shows up and down the country. In his show An evening with Andy Abraham, he sang "Whenever you need me" with a children's choir. The children's choir were named by Andy to be the best kids he had worked with and were featured in the stagecoach magazine.

During 2012–2013, he toured both in the "History of the Big Bands" and "Boogie Nights" as lead vocalist.

In April 2015, Abraham took to the stage in the musical Godspell. The show concluded in May.

Discography

Albums

Singles

References

External links 

Video interview on ITV Local Yorkshire

1964 births
Living people
21st-century Black British male singers
People from Enfield, London
Eurovision Song Contest entrants for the United Kingdom
Eurovision Song Contest entrants of 2008
English people of Grenadian descent
The X Factor (British TV series) contestants